Daniel Garrison Brinton (May 13, 1837July 31, 1899) was an American surgeon, historian, archaeologist and ethnologist.

Biography
Brinton was born in Thornbury Township, Chester County, Pennsylvania. After graduating from Yale University in 1858, Brinton studied at Jefferson Medical College for two years and spent the next year travelling in Europe. He continued his studies at Paris and Heidelberg. From 1862 to 1865, during the American Civil War, he was a surgeon in the Union army, acting during 1864–1865 as surgeon-in-charge of the U.S. Army general hospital at Quincy, Illinois. Brinton was sun-stroked at Missionary Ridge (Third Battle of Chattanooga) and was never again able to travel in very hot weathers. This handicap affected his career as an ethnologist.

After the war, Brinton practiced medicine in West Chester, Pennsylvania for several years; was the editor of a weekly periodical, the Medical and Surgical Reporter, in Philadelphia from 1874 to 1887; became professor of ethnology and archaeology in the Academy of Natural Sciences in Philadelphia in 1884; and was professor of American linguistics and archaeology in the University of Pennsylvania from 1886 until his death.

He was a member of numerous learned societies in the United States and in Europe and was president at different times of the Numismatic and Antiquarian Society of Philadelphia, of the American Folklore Society, the American Philosophical Society, and of the American Association for the Advancement of Science.

At his presidential address to the American Association for the Advancement of Science in August 1895, Brinton advocated theories of scientific racism that were pervasive at that time. As Charles A. Lofgren notes in his book, The Plessy Case, although Brinton "accepted the 'psychical unity' throughout the human species," he claimed "all races were 'not equally endowed,' which disqualified [some of] them from the atmosphere of modern enlightenment."   He asserted some have "...an inborn tendency, constitutionally recreant to the codes of civilization, and therefore technically criminal."  Further, he said the characteristics of "races, nations, tribes...supply the only sure foundations for legislation, not a priori notions of the rights of man."<ref>   Charles A. Lofgren, "The Plessy Case: A Legal-Historical Interpretation, Oxford University Press (1988), pp. 104–05.]  </ref>

Brinton was an anarchist during his last several years of life. In April 1896, he addressed the Ethical Fellowship of Philadelphia with a lecture on "What the Anarchists Want," to a friendly audience. In October 1897, Brinton had dinner with Peter Kropotkin after the famous anarchist's only speaking engagement at Philadelphia. Kropotkin had refused invitations from all of the city's elites.Letters, Brinton to Horace Traubel, April 26 and 27, 1896. Special Collections Dept., Temple University

On the occasion of his memorial meeting on October 6, 1900, the keynote speaker Albert H. Smyth stated: "In Europe and America, he sought the society of anarchists and mingled sometimes with the malcontents of the world that he might appreciate their grievances, and weigh their propositions for reform and change."

Works
From 1868 to 1899, Brinton wrote many books, and a large number of pamphlets, brochures, addresses and magazine articles.
His works include:
 [https://archive.org/details/americanheromyth00brin American Hero-Myths: A Study in the Native Religions of the Western Continent. Library of Aboriginal American Literature. No. VIII Aboriginal American authors and their productions Notes on the Floridian Peninsula (1859)
 The Myths of the New World (1868), an attempt to analyse and correlate, scientifically, the mythology of the American Indians
 A Guide-Book of Florida and the South (1869)
 The Religious Sentiment: its Sources and Aim: A Contribution to the Science and Philosophy of Religion (1876)
 American Hero Myths (1882)
 The Annals of the Cakchiquels (1885)
 
  (Exposé of the hoax grammar of the so-called Taensa language.)
 
 Ancient nahuatl poetry 1890
 Essays of an Americanist (1890)
 Races and Peoples: lectures on the science of ethnography (1890);
 The American Race (1891)
 The Pursuit of Happiness (1893)
 Nagualism, A Study in Native American Folk-lore and History (1894)
 A Primer of Mayan Hieroglyphics, Publications of the University of Pennsylvania. Series in philology, literature and archaeology, vol. 3, no. 2 (1895) (also available at https://archive.org/details/b24873779)
 Religions of Primitive People'' (1897)
In addition, he edited and published a Library of American Aboriginal Literature (8 vols. 1882–1890), a valuable contribution to the science of anthropology in America. Of the eight volumes; six were edited by Brinton himself, one by Horatio Hale and one by Albert Samuel Gatschet. His 1885 work is notable for its role in the Walam Olum controversy.

References

External links

Entire work of Daniel Garrison Brinton
Daniel Garrison Brinton Archival Collection at the University of Pennsylvania Museum

1837 births
1899 deaths
19th-century Mesoamericanists
American anarchists
American archaeologists
American expatriates in France
American expatriates in Germany
American ethnologists
American Mesoamericanists
Historians of Mesoamerica
Historians from Pennsylvania
Linguists of Algic languages
Linguists of Arawakan languages
Mesoamerican anthropologists
People from Chester County, Pennsylvania
Physicians from Pennsylvania
Proponents of scientific racism
Union Army surgeons
Yale University alumni
Linguists of indigenous languages of the Americas
Presidents of the American Folklore Society